The Albemarle Rockets were a minor league baseball teams based in Albemarle, North Carolina. In 1948, the Rockets played as members of the Class D level North Carolina State League, hosting home games at Morton Park.

History
Before the 1948 season, the Landis Millers minor league franchise of the North Carolina State League moved to Albemarle, North Carolina. The move reportedly occurred because the Landis team, owned by P.K. Drye, was building a new ballpark and construction wasn’t complete in time to begin the 1948 season.

The Albemarle Rockets first began minor league play in 1948 after Landis relocated. The Rockets became members of the eight–team Class D level North Carolina State League. The Concord Weavers, Hickory Rebels, High Point-Thomasville Hi-Toms, Lexington Indians, Mooresville Moors, Salisbury Pirates and Statesville Owls joined Albemarle in league play.

After beginning league play on April 30, 1948, the 1948 Albemarle Rockets finished last in the North Carolina State League final standings. Albemarle did not qualify for the playoffs, eventually won by the Statesville Owls. The Rockets ended the regular season with a record of 32–78, placing 8th in the eight–team league, playing under managers Stankley Brown, James Miller and George Motto. Albemarle finished 35.5 games behind the 1st place High Point-Thomasville Hi-Toms in the final regular season standings. The High Point-Thomasville team (67–43), Statesville Owls (63–47), Hickory Rebels (61–49), Lexington Indians (59–50), Mooresville Moors (57–52), Salisbury Pirates (51–53) and Concord Weavers (44–62) finished ahead of Albemarle in the final regular standings. The Albemarle Rockets played home games at Morton Ballpark, where season attendance was 28,025, an average of 510 per game. The Rockets relocated back to Landis following the 1948 season.

In 1949, the franchise moved back to Landis, North Carolina and became the Landis Spinners, with Morton Park reportedly being utilized by American Legion teams through the 1960's.

Albemarle, North Carolina has not hosted another minor league team.

The ballpark
The Albemarle Rockets played home minor league games at Morton Park. Reportedly the ballpark was built in 1947 by brothers Clarence and Charlie Morton at a cost of $45,000, including a $14,000 lighting system. The new ballpark also had dressing rooms, showers, a press box and seating for 500 fans, with a cement block outfield wall. Admission to Rockets home games was said to have been .60 cents for adults and .25 cents for children. The ballpark was noted to have been located east of Albemarle on Highway 24/27/73.

Year–by–year record

Notable alumni
No alumni of the Albemarle Rockets advanced to the major leagues.

References

External links
Baseball Reference
1948 team photo

Defunct minor league baseball teams
Defunct baseball teams in North Carolina
Professional baseball teams in North Carolina
Baseball teams disestablished in 1948
Baseball teams established in 1948
Stanly County, North Carolina